Salah Fettouh (born 5 May 1948) is a Moroccan sprinter. He competed in the men's 4 × 400 metres relay at the 1972 Summer Olympics.

References

External links
 

1948 births
Living people
Athletes (track and field) at the 1972 Summer Olympics
Moroccan male sprinters
Olympic athletes of Morocco
Place of birth missing (living people)